Jimmy is a 1979 Indian Malayalam film,  directed by Melattoor Ravi Varma and produced by T. E. Vasudevan. The film stars K. P. Ummer, Sankaradi, Raghavan, Sathaar and Janardanan in the lead roles. The film has musical score by V. Dakshinamoorthy.

Cast
Premnazir (cameo role)
Sankaradi
Raghavan
Sathaar
Janardanan
K. P. Ummer
Ravikumar
Seema
Vidhubala

Soundtrack
The music was composed by V. Dakshinamoorthy and the lyrics were written by Sreekumaran Thampi.

References

External links
 

1979 films
1970s Malayalam-language films